Linda Watson may refer to:
 Linda Watson (field hockey)
 Linda Watson (soprano)